Jayram Vitthal Pawar Aka J.V. Pawar (birth; 14 July 1943 ) is a poet and novelist who co-founded the Dalit Panther and served as its general secretary.

Biography 
J.V. Pawar is a poet and novelist who co-founded the Dalit Panther and served as its general secretary. 

He is best known for his 1969 novel 'Balidaan' and 'Naakebandi' his 1976 collection of poems, since translated and published in English as 'Blockade'.

Among his many books, he has devoted himself to documenting and analyzing the post-Ambedkar Dalit movements in several volumes.

A lifelong Ambedkarite, Pawar has been involved in several Dalitbahujan social and political movements in Maharashtra.

Books 

 Dalit Panthers
 Mother India: Miss Catherine Mayo's much-loved work
 Dalit Panthers: An Authoritative History
 Ambedkarite Movement After Ambedkar
 Blockade
 Dr. B.R. Ambedkar's Social Revolution

References

Living people
1943 births
Dalit rights activists
Indian political party founders
Indian poets
Indian novelists